The Vicky Bliss Mysteries is a mystery novel series by Barbara Mertz, writing as Elizabeth Peters. A published Egyptologist, Mertz wrote three mystery series and a number of stand-alone novels under the name Elizabeth Peters plus gothic and supernatural thrillers under the name Barbara Michaels. 

The Vicky Bliss novels are set in late 20th century Europe and Egypt.

Series
The Camelot Caper (1969) (another title - Her Cousin John)
Borrower of the Night (1973)
Street of the Five Moons (1978)
Silhouette in Scarlet (1983)
Trojan Gold (1987)
Night Train to Memphis (1994)
The Laughter of Dead Kings (2008)

Characters

Victoria Bliss 
Doctor Victoria Bliss is a beautiful, statuesque blonde whose physical beauty means some people do not take her seriously - as an art historian or a detective. She specializes in medieval art and, after the first novel, works for Herr Schmidt at the National Museum in Munich. She and John first became involved during her investigation of his activities in Rome.

John Tregarth 
John Tregarth, alias Sir John Smythe, is a master criminal who specializes in art forgeries; he may or may not be reforming from his criminal life. He has care of the family home in England, as well as his mother, Jen (short for Guinevere). The Laughter of Dead Kings contains animate and inanimate hints that Sir John is descended from the 'Peabody-Emerson' family featured in Mertz' Amelia Peabody mysteries.

Anton Z. Schmidt 
Herr Professor Anton Z. Schmidt is Vicky's rotund, jovial boss. His physical attributes and phenomenal appetite means that he, like Vicky, is sometimes not taken seriously. But he is smart and courageous, has an incredible memory and a strong sense of adventure fueled by his great imagination.

References

Crime novel series
Novels set in Germany
Novels set in the 20th century
Novels about museums